The women's shot put throwing event at the 1960 Olympic Games took place on 2 September.

Results
Top 12 throwers and ties plus all throwers reaching 14.50 metres advanced to the finals. All distances are listed in metres.

Qualifying

Final

Key: OR = Olympic record

References

M
Shot put at the Olympics
1960 in women's athletics
Women's events at the 1960 Summer Olympics